WGSR may refer to:

 WGSR-LD, a low-power television station (channel 19) licensed to serve Reidsville, North Carolina, United States
 Water-gas shift reaction